Richard P. Howell (September 3, 1831 – April 5, 1899) was an American carpenter, businessman, and politician.

Early life and education 
Howell was born in Pennant, Powys, in the parish of Llanbrynmair, Powys, Montgomeryshire, Wales, United Kingdom. He went to the public schools in Wales. In 1854, Howell emigrated to the United States and settled in Racine, Wisconsin. Howell worked as a carpenter and was a contractor. He also was involved with the banking business in Racine. Howell served on the Racine Board of Education and on the Racine County, Wisconsin Board of Supervisors. Howell was a Republican. In 1882, Howell served in the Wisconsin Assembly. Howell died at his home in Racine, Wisconsin. He was suffering from rheumatism.

Notes

External links

1831 births
1899 deaths
Welsh emigrants to the United States
People from Powys
Politicians from Racine, Wisconsin
Businesspeople from Racine, Wisconsin
American carpenters
School board members in Wisconsin
County supervisors in Wisconsin
Republican Party members of the Wisconsin State Assembly
19th-century American politicians
19th-century American businesspeople